Kenya National Archives and Documentation Services (KNADS) is situated at the edge of the central business district in downtown Nairobi along Moi Avenue next to Ambassadeur Hotel. The archives look out on the landmark Hilton Hotel, while on the rear side is Tom Mboya street. It was established in 1965. It holds 40,000 volumes. It was established by an Act of the Parliament of Kenya in 1965 and was placed under the office of the Vice President and the Minister of Home Affairs. It is currently under the office of the Vice-President and State Department for National Heritage and Culture.
The Kenya National Archives building also houses the Murumbi Gallery which contains African artifacts that were collected in the 19th century.

Murumbi Gallery 
The gallery is situated at the ground floor of the Kenya National Archives building and it is named after Joseph Murumbi, who was the  second vice president of Kenya. It is currently the largest Pan-African art gallery in Africa and it contains ancient art collections from different regions and communities of Africa. 

Afraid that Murimbi might dispose his collections to a foreign buyer the then 1st Black Director of the Archives  Dr Maina David Kagombe published a gazette notice in March 1976 Stopping anyone including Murumbi from selling aboard any items the Director considered to be antiquities of Natural Cultural Value. 

Murumbi was forced to sell his collection and Muthaiga Home to the government of Kenya.

The collected artifacts were acquired by the government of Kenya after a concessionary arrangement was agreed upon with Joseph Murumbi, who had initially turned down several huge offers to buy his collections by overseas bidders.

See also
 List of national archives

References

Bibliography

External links 

 https://web.archive.org/web/20091227200253/http://www.kenyarchives.go.ke/
 Kenya National Archives at Google Cultural Institute

Organisations based in Nairobi
National archives
1960s establishments in Kenya
History of Kenya